Glen Gordon Richardson (born September 20, 1955) is a retired professional ice hockey player who played 24 games in the National Hockey League, all with the Vancouver Canucks. Selected by the Canucks in the 1975 NHL Amateur Draft, he joined the team that year, splitting the season between the NHL and the minor Central Hockey League (CHL). Richardson would play two more seasons in the CHL before retiring in 1978.

Career

Junior career
Richardson began his career with the Kitchener Rangers of the Ontario Hockey Association (OHA). He played two seasons with the team from 1972–1974, playing in 78 games while recording 32 points (13 goals and 19 assists). He played the next two seasons with the Hamilton Red Wings, who renamed to the Hamilton Fincups in his second season with the club, scoring 78 points in 93 games, 72 in his final year.

Professional career
Drafted 38th overall to Vancouver in 1975, he made his debut in 1975-76, notching 9 points (3 goals, 6 assists) in the 24 games he played. He was a -1 with 19 penalty minutes. In the same year, Richardson went to the Tulsa Oilers of the Central Hockey League (CHL), where he played the rest of his career. Playing 186 contests with the Oilers, Richardson had a total of 117 points.

Career statistics

Regular season and playoffs

External links 

1955 births
Living people
Canadian ice hockey left wingers
Hamilton Fincups players
Hamilton Red Wings (OHA) players
Ice hockey people from Ontario
Kitchener Rangers players
Sportspeople from Barrie
Tulsa Oilers (1964–1984) players
Vancouver Canucks draft picks
Vancouver Canucks players
Winnipeg Jets (WHA) draft picks